Joseph Gian (born July 13, 1961) is an American actor and singer, probably best known for his role as Detective Tom Ryan in the television series Knots Landing. He appeared on the program from 1989 to 1991 and again in 1993. Gian was the male vocalist champion in the 1986 edition of Star Search.

Career 
Gian played openly gay police officer Rick Silardi in the series Hooperman, which ran from 1987 to 1989. He also played Kenny Bannerman in several episodes of Beverly Hills, 90210 in 1996.

His film credits include roles in Blue Skies Again (1983), A Night in Heaven (1983), The Night Stalker (1987), Death Before Dishonor (1987), Blackout (1988), Mad About You (1989), and Return to Me (2000).

In more recent years, Gian has been performing in Las Vegas. He also sang the theme song of Special Agent Oso.

Filmography

Film

Television

References

External links
Official website: JoeyGian.com

1961 births
Living people
American male singers
Songwriters from Florida
American male television actors
American male film actors
People from North Miami Beach, Florida
American male songwriters